Woccon was one of two Catawban (also known as Eastern Siouan) languages of what is now the Eastern United States. Together with the Western Siouan languages, they formed the Siouan language family. It is attested only in a vocabulary of 143 words, printed in a 1709 compilation by English colonist John Lawson of Carolina. The Woccon people that Lawson encountered have been considered by scholars to have been a late subdivision of the Waccamaw.

The Woccon are believed to have been decimated as a people during the Tuscarora War in the Carolinas with English colonists in 1713. Survivors were likely absorbed into the Tuscarora, an Iroquoian-speaking people. Most of the Tuscarora migrated north to New York, settling with the five nations of the Iroquois Confederacy by 1722 and being accepted as the sixth. Under these pressures, the Woccon language is believed to have become extinct in the eighteenth century. Some descendants of partial Woccon ancestry survive in the Southeast as well as Canada, where the Six Nations of the Iroquois migrated after the American Revolutionary War. 

In 2021 the Living Tongues Institute for Endangered Languages assisted the Cape Fear Band of Skarure and Woccon Indians in North Carolina to build a 'Living Dictionary' for Woccon as part of an effort to revive the language. This group is not state-recognized or federally recognized as being descended from the Cape Fear, Tuscarora, or the Waccamaw.

References

Further reading
Rudes, B.A. (2000). "Resurrecting coastal Catawban: The reconstituted phonology and morphology of the Woccon language". Southern Journal of Linguistics 24: 228-244.

Woccon Living Dictionary (2021). Living Tongues Institute for Endangered Languages. https://livingdictionaries.app/woccon

Catawban languages
Extinct languages of North America